Marko Mäetamm (born 13 December 1965, in Viljandi, Estonia) is an Estonian multimedia artist, working within the mediums of video, drawing and the internet.

Mäetamm began studying graphic art at the Estonian Academy of Arts in 1988 and received his M.A. from the academy in 1996. Mäetamm also studied practicing print technologies at the Swedish Royal Art High School.

His professional art career spanning over two decades, Mäetamm emerged as one of the most prominent artists in Estonia upon graduating from Estonian Art Academy. Marko Mäetamm has exhibited internationally since the 1990s and represented Estonia at the 52nd Venice Bienniale in 2007 and in 2003 as a part of artists duo John Smith (with Kaido Ole) in the Estonian pavilion.

Throughout his practice, the artist's primary focus has been on family life, which he has explored though videos and paintings. Treating the family as a microcosm of a wider socio-political and economic models, Mäetamm collects petty every-day situations, presenting them filtered through a prism of his unmistakable dark humour. Partly inspired by his own private life, Mäetamm's work explores the grey area where ambiguous feelings of being in control and being controlled merge.

Awards
2008 Order of the White Star V Class
2002 Painting's Prize of the Estonian Painter's Association.
2000 Kristjan Raud annual art award
2000 Harpoon. Annual art award of Vaal Gallery
1999 Stipendium of Cultural Endowment
1997 UNDP annual prize

Books by Marko Mäetamm
MARKO und KAIDO -  Under the pen name "John Smith". Center for Contemporary Arts, Estonia. Tallinn, 2003
Rääkivad majad - Speaking Houses. R/I/B/O/P, Tallinn, 2003

References/External links
Marko Mäetamm's Homepage
Temnikova & Kasela gallery
Marko Mäetamm's profile at Estonian Contemporary Art Center's webpage
Interview with Marko Mäetamm, Arterritory.com
Ikon Gallery, Birmingham

1965 births
Living people
People from Viljandi
Recipients of the Order of the White Star, 5th Class
20th-century Estonian male artists
21st-century Estonian male artists
Estonian Academy of Arts alumni